Holas (Czech feminine: Holasová) is a surname. Notable people with the surname include:

 Aneta Holasová (born 2001), Czech gymnast
 Emil Holas (1917–1985), Czech psychology educator and writer

See also
 

Czech-language surnames